Tokachi-Mitsumata Caldera is an 8-km wide volcanic caldera in the Ishikari Mountains of Daisetsuzan National Park in Hokkaidō, Japan.

The caldera is bounded to the north by the Ishikari Mountains and to the southwest by the Nipesotsu-Maruyama Volcanic Group.

See Also
 List of volcanoes in Japan

References
 Tokachi-Mitsumata Caldera, Quaternary Volcanoes of Japan, Geological Survey of Japan, AIST, 2006
 

Calderas of Hokkaido
Volcanoes of Hokkaido
Pleistocene calderas